Livio Lorenzon (6 May 1923 – 23 December 1971) was an Italian actor who was mainly active during the 1950s and 1960s.

Biography
He played minor roles in some memorable commedia all'Italiana movies directed by the likes of Dino Risi and Mario Monicelli.

On the international stage Lorenzon is best known for his small roles in Spaghetti Western films in the 1960s, appearing in The Good, the Bad and the Ugly, and The Secret Seven in 1966.

Other genres he starred in were sword and sandal films and pirate films like Queen of the Pirates and Terror on the Seas.

He had a mature manliness in his demeanor which made him believable in many disparate roles: clad in the sandals and lorica as a Roman centurion, donning a poncho and sombrero of a desperado or even as a "tough as nails" sergeant in World War I in La Grande Guerra.

Seldom if ever cast as protagonist Lorenzon made up by working hectic schedules, appearing in some 75 movies between 1952 and 1969. When he did appear in movies, his voice was re-dubbed by professional voice dubbers, especially Renato Turi.

Death
He died in 1971 in Latisana in his native Friuli, of cirrhosis of the liver, aged 48.

Selected filmography

 Shadows Over Trieste (1952) - Carmine
 Human Torpedoes (1954) - Sergente (uncredited)
 Bertoldo, Bertoldino e Cacasenno (1954)
 The Prince with the Red Mask (1955) - Monaldo
 Accadde tra le sbarre (1955) - Prisoner
 La catena dell'odio (1955)
 Storia di una minorenne (1956)
 El Alamein (1957) - Nardi
 The Dragon's Blood (1957)
 Slave Women of Corinth (1958) - La Spia
 The Day the Sky Exploded (1958) - British General
 Captain Falcon (1958) - Captain Manfredo
 Anche l'inferno trema (1958)
 Cavalier in Devil's Castle (1959) - Guidobaldo Fortebraccio
 The Son of the Red Corsair (1959) - José, pirata
 Goliath and the Barbarians (1959) - Igor
 L'arciere nero (1959) - Lodrosio
 The Great War (1959) - Sergente Barriferri
 Il terrore dell'Oklahoma (1959) - Duke Travis
 Il vedovo (1959) - Stucchi
 Attack of the Moors (1959) - Basirocco
 Terror of the Red Mask (1960) - Astolfo
 Le signore (1960) - Fabretti
 The Night They Killed Rasputin (1960)
 Knight of 100 Faces (1960) - Conte Fosco Di Vallebruna
 Queen of the Pirates (1960) - Pirate Chief
 La sceriffa (1960) - Jimmy Jesse
 Fury of the Pagans (1960) - Kovo
 Pirates of the Coast (1960) - Olonese
 Gastone (1960) - Captain Negri
 Cavalcata selvaggia (1960)
 Guns of the Black Witch (1961) - Guzman
 Revolt of the Mercenaries (1961) - Conte Keller Paroli
 Rome 1585 (1961)
 Revolt of the Mercenaries (1961)
 The Secret of the Black Falcon (1961) - Sergeant Rodriguez
 The Invincible Gladiator (1961) - Itus
 The Vengeance of Ursus (1961) - King Zagro (credit only)
 Sword in the Shadows (1961) - Capitano Mellina
 Pontius Pilate (1962) - Barabbas
 Venus Against the Son of Hercules (1962)
 Tharus Son of Attila (1962) - King Hatum
 Zorro alla corte di Spagna (1962) - Capitano Morales
 Gladiators 7 (1962) - Panurgus
 Zorro and the Three Musketeers (1963) - Porthos
 Goliath and the Sins of Babylon (1963) - Evandro
 Gli invincibili sette (1963) - Rubio
 Shivers in Summer (1964) - Giulio Cittelli
 Hercules Against Rome (1964) - Mansurio
 Queste pazze, pazze donne (1964) - Vismara ('Siciliani a Milano')
 Messalina vs. the Son of Hercules (1964) - Prefect of the court
 I due evasi di Sing Sing (1964) - Lemmy Tristano
 The Last Gun (1964) - Jess - Capobanda
 Samson and His Mighty Challenge (1964)
 Hercules and the Tyrants of Babylon (1964) - Salmanassar, Brother of Assur
 Gladiators Seven (1964) - Nemete
 Il figlio di Cleopatra (1964) - Petronio
 Revenge of The Gladiators (1964) - Genserico il Vandalo
 Challenge of the Gladiator (1965) - Commodio
 La Colt è la mia legge (1965) - O'Brien's Henchman
 Colorado Charlie (1965) - Colorado Charlie
 Mondo pazzo... gente matta! (1966) - Impresario with moustache
 Gunman Called Nebraska (1966) - Sceriffo Bert
 Go with God, Gringo (1966) - Don Pedro
 Texas, Adios (1966) - Alcalde Miguel
 The Good, the Bad and the Ugly (1966) - Baker
 Master Stroke (1967) - Miguel
 Io non protesto, io amo (1967) - Barone Francesco Maria Calò
 Cjamango (1967) - Don Pablo
 2 RRRingos no Texas (1967) - Union Captain
 Buckaroo: The Winchester Does Not Forgive (1967) - Lash
 Giurò... e li uccise ad uno ad uno... Piluk il timido (1968) - Dr. Burt Lucas
 Una forca per un bastardo (1968) - Foster
 Rita of the West (1968) - A dying man (uncredited)
 Don Chisciotte and Sancio Panza (1968) - Thief
 Torture Me But Kill Me with Kisses (1968) - Artemio Di Giovanni
 Ace High (1968) - Paco Rosa
 Crisantemi per un branco di carogne (1968)
 Colpo sensazionale al servizio del Sifar (1968) - Professor Antinori
 God Will Forgive My Pistol (1969) - Ramon Ramirez
 Agguato sul Bosforo (1969) - Hakim
 I 2 magnifici fresconi (1969) - Vismara (uncredited)

References

External links
 
Livio Lorenzon blog

1923 births
1971 deaths
Actors from Trieste
Italian male film actors
Male Spaghetti Western actors
Deaths from cirrhosis
20th-century Italian male actors